Amanda O'Regan (born 1982 in Douglas) is a camogie player and secondary school teacher based in Kanturk, winner of All Ireland medals in 2005, 2006, 2008 and 2009. She scored a crucial goal in the 2005 final when her speculative 45 found its way into the Tipperary goal. She was a nominee for All Star awards in 2006 and 2007.
Amanda won three Ashbourne Cup medals with University of Limerick. She is the holder of All-Ireland Minor, Junior and Senior honours and is also an accomplished basketball player. Her father, Michael, won an All-Ireland Minor football medal and is a selector today, while mother, Christine, captured a Junior All-Ireland medal in 1980. Amanda captained her club, Douglas, to their first Senior county championship title in 2008 and captained Cork to the 2009 All Ireland championship.

References

External links 
Official Camogie Website
  Diary of winning manager Denise Cronin in On The Ball Official Camogie Magazine
 O'Regan Revels in Rebel Revival Irish Independent 23 July 2008
 Fixtures and results for the 2009 O'Duffy Cup
 All-Ireland Senior Camogie Championship: Roll of Honour
 Video highlights of 2009 championship Part One and part two
 Video Highlights of 2009 All Ireland Senior Final
 Report of All Ireland final in  Irish Times Independent and Examiner

1982 births
Living people
Cork camogie players
Irish schoolteachers